Elizabeth Quay railway station, formerly known as Esplanade station, serves the southern end of Perth's central business district including Elizabeth Quay and the Perth Convention and Exhibition Centre. It is part of the Transperth network.

History

Elizabeth Quay, then known as Esplanade Station, was built as part of the New MetroRail project. Construction began in 2004 with the station opening under the name Esplanade station on 15 October 2007, as the terminus of the Joondalup line. On 23 December 2007, the Mandurah line opened and through services commenced. On 31 January 2016, to facilitate the opening of Elizabeth Quay, Esplanade station and the Esplanade Busport were renamed to Elizabeth Quay railway station and Elizabeth Quay Bus Station at an estimated combined cost of $700,000. The opposition Labor Party criticised the costs given the state's poor finances.

Services
Elizabeth Quay station is served by Transperth Joondalup and Mandurah line services.

Platforms
Elizabeth Quay station has the following platform configuration:

Transport links
Bus transfers are available at the adjoining Elizabeth Quay Bus Station, including the Blue CAT. Ferry transfers are available at Elizabeth Quay nearby.

References

External links

 Station map New MetroRail

Elizabeth Quay
Joondalup line
Mandurah line
Railway stations in Perth, Western Australia
Railway stations in Australia opened in 2007
Railway stations located underground in Perth, Western Australia